Anything in Return is the third studio album by American recording artist Toro y Moi, released on January 22, 2013 by Carpark Records. Toro y Moi describes it as a "bigger sounding album, more accessible and poppy", as he lyrically wrestles between relationship problems and life on the road.

Music videos
Toro y Moi released four music videos from the album. The video for "So Many Details", released on December 12, 2012, was directed by HARRYS. HARRYS also directed the second video from the album, "Say That", released on January 2, 2013. The music video for the song "Never Matter", directed by Steve Daniels and released on March 25, 2013, features a group of individuals listening to the track on headphones and dancing along.  The fourth video, "Rose Quartz", featured animated paintings by artist Lauren Gregory.

Track listing

Personnel
Credits adapted from the liner notes of Anything in Return.

 Chaz Bundick – design, engineering, layout, mixing, performer, production
 Patrick Brown – engineering, mixing
 Jorge Hernandez – second engineering
 Joe Lambert – mastering
 John Stortz – drawing

Charts

Release history

References

2013 albums
Carpark Records albums
Toro y Moi albums